Lanaudière is one of the seventeen administrative regions of Quebec, Canada, situated immediately to the northeast of Montreal. It has a total population (2016 Census) of 494,796 inhabitants, an increase of 4.9% over the 2011 census.

Geography
The region of Lanaudière is part of central Quebec and is located between the Saint Lawrence River and the Laurentian Mountains, between Mauricie and the Laurentides. Lanaudière attracts a good deal of interest from vacationers due to its unique character founded largely on the harmony between its culture and the surrounding natural environment. Lanaudière is generally rural, while the urban areas are generally concentrated in the south of the region, such as Repentigny, Terrebonne and Berthierville. The altitude rises as one goes northwards; it is  near the Saint Lawrence River to almost  at the top of mountains near Saint-Donat and Saint-Zénon.

Lanaudière is made up of three distinct geographical groupings: the southern plain has cities and farming villages and includes many historical locations; the piedmont in the centre has become a vacation spot due to its numerous lakes and natural attractions, and the Laurentian Plateau in the far north in the forested country is known for its fishing and hiking.

The three main ports of entry for Lanaudière are all in the south: Terrebonne, Repentigny and Berthierville.

Lanaudière's road network was developed according to three north-south axes (25-125, 31-131, 347), all of which have few links with the neighbouring regions. Even though this internal network is almost exclusively composed of secondary roads, it is well-designed for long automobile trips or for biking. Lanaudière has two wildlife preserves, the Rouge-Matawin and the Mastigouche, as well as part of the Mont Tremblant park. Further to the north, about an hour away from Saint-Michel-des-Saints, there is the Atikamekw indian reserve of Manawan.

History
The region of Lanaudière owes its name to history - it perpetuates the memory of Marie-Charlotte de Lanaudière, daughter of the lord of Lavaltrie and wife of the businessman Barthélemy Joliette, descendant of the famous explorer Louis Jolliet. The name Lanaudière evokes the lineage of the lords De Lanaudière who contributed, over seven generations, to the defence and the development of the French colonies in America, of France and of the region.

Administrative divisions

Regional county municipalities

Nation Atikamekw 
 Manawan

School districts 
The 10 French-language districts have service by the two school service centres of the region and two districts by centres of Laurentides:

 Commission scolaire des Affluents; (L'Assomption, Les Moulins (except a district part of Terrebonne served by Commission scolaire de la Seigneurie-des-Mille-Îles))
 Commission scolaire des Samares (D'Autray, Montcalm, Joliette et Matawinie (except the district of Saint-Donat served by Centre de services scolaire des Laurentides)).

Major communities
Joliette
L'Assomption
L'Épiphanie
Lavaltrie
Mascouche
Notre-Dame-des-Prairies
RawdonRepentigny
Saint-Calixte
Saint-Charles-Borromée
Saint-Félix-de-Valois
Saint-Lin-Laurentides
Sainte-Julienne
Terrebonne

See also
List of Quebec regions

References

External links

Portail régional de Lanaudière Official website
CRÉ

 
Administrative regions of Quebec